Marlborough may refer to:

Places

United Kingdom
 Marlborough, Wiltshire, England
 Marlborough College, public school
 Marlborough School, Woodstock in Oxfordshire, England
 The Marlborough Science Academy in Hertfordshire, England

Australia
 Marlborough, Queensland
 Principality of Marlborough, a short-lived micronation in 1993

Canada
 Marlborough, Calgary, neighbourhood in Calgary
 Marlborough Park, Calgary, neighbourhood in Calgary
 Marlborough Mall, shopping center in Calgary
 Marlborough Township, Ontario

Indonesia
 Fort Marlborough, a fortress in the city of Bengkulu, from the British era
 Jalan Malioboro, the main street (jalan) of the city of Yogyakarta, the name of which is believed to be an Indonesianised version of Marlborough

Malaysia
 Marlborough College, an outpost of the college in England

New Zealand
 Marlborough, Auckland, a suburb of Auckland
 Marlborough Province, in the South Island, from 1859 to 1876
 Marlborough Region, in the South Island (formerly the Marlborough Province), noted for the wine from its Sauvignon Blanc grapes

United States

California 
 Marlborough School (Los Angeles), all-girl college prep school

Connecticut 
 Marlborough, Connecticut, town in Hartford County

Massachusetts 
 Marlborough, Massachusetts, city in Middlesex County
 New Marlborough, Massachusetts, town in Berkshire County

Missouri 
 Marlborough, Missouri, village in St. Louis County

New Hampshire 
 Marlborough, New Hampshire, town in Cheshire County
 Marlborough (CDP), New Hampshire, the main village in the town

New York 
 Marlborough, New York, town in Ulster County

Pennsylvania 
 Marlborough Township, Montgomery County, Pennsylvania
 East Marlborough Township, Chester County, Pennsylvania
 West Marlborough Township, Chester County, Pennsylvania

Zimbabwe
 Marlborough, a suburb of Harare
 Marlborough High School, a secondary education school in Harare

People
 John Churchill, 1st Duke of Marlborough (1650–1722), 18th century British commander
 For subsequent dukes, see Duke of Marlborough (title)
 Earl of Marlborough, a title in the peerage of England
 Henry Marlborough (?–?), English politician
 Morgan Marlborough (born 1990), American footballer
 Norm Marlborough (born 1945), Australian politician
 Thomas of Marlborough (died 1236), English monk and writer

Cars
 Marlborough (Anglo-French car), made between 1906 and 1926
 Marlborough (New Zealand car), made between 1912 and 1920
 Marlborough-Thomas, British, made between 1923 and 1924

Ships
 HMS Marlborough, the name of several Royal Navy ships
 , a second-rate, renamed Marlborough 1706–1762
 , a third-rate, 1767–1800
 , a third-rate, 1807–1835
 , a first-rate, 1855–1924
 , a battleship, 1912–1932
 , a frigate, 1989–2008 (sold to the Chilean Navy)
 Marlborough (1876 ship), British merchant sailing ship, 1876–1890

Other
 Marlborough (New Zealand electorate), centred on the Marlborough region
 Marlborough (wine), a wine region in New Zealand
 Marlborough Fine Art, an international art gallery headquartered in London, England
 Marlborough House, London, England
 Old Marlborough Road, in Massachusetts 
 The Old Marlborough Road, a poem by Henry David Thoreau
 Toronto Marlborough Athletic Club, an ice hockey team in Toronto, Ontario

See also
 Malborough, village in Devon, England
 Marlboro (disambiguation)